The following is the complete discography of the American alternative rock/electronica duo Idiot Pilot.

Albums

Studio albums

Extended plays

Singles

Music videos

References

Discographies of American artists
Rock music group discographies